Stensrud  is a surname of Norwegian origin. Notable people with the surname include:

 Abel Stensrud (born 2002), Norwegian footballer
 David Stensrud (born 1961), American atmospheric scientist
 Einar Stensrud, (1895–1964), Norwegian sports wrestler
 Henning Stensrud (born 1977), Norwegian ski jumper
 Ingrid Stensrud (born 1986), Norwegian curler
 Kirk Stensrud, (born 1962), Minnesota politician
 Kristoffer Stensrud (1953–2021), Norwegian financial services executive
 Mike Stensrud, (born 1956), American football player
 Øyvind Alfred Stensrud (1887–1956), Norwegian politician
 Torgeir Stensrud (born 1949), Norwegian businessman
 Wenche Halvorsen Stensrud, Norwegian handball player

Surnames of Norwegian origin